Arronches is a municipality in Portugal. The population in 2011 was 3,165, in an area of 314.65 km2.

The municipality is located by the Serra de São Mamede in Portalegre District.

The present Mayor is Fermelinda Carvalho (PSD) and the President of the Municipal Assembly is Abílio Panasco (PSD). The municipal holiday is June 24, after Saint John the Baptist.

Parishes
Administratively, the municipality is divided into 3 civil parishes (freguesias):
 Assunção
 Esperança
 Mosteiros

Notable people 
 Isabel Abreu (born 1978) a Portuguese actress.

References

Populated places in Portalegre District
Municipalities of Portalegre District